Patrick Joseph Creedy (18 November 1927 – 7 April 2011) was a New Zealand rugby football player who represented New Zealand in rugby league.

Playing career
Creedy originally played rugby union and represented both the Southland Rugby Union and the Canterbury Rugby Union.

Creedy later switched codes to rugby league and joined the Marist club in the Canterbury Rugby League competition. He represented Canterbury and in 1955 was selected at halfback for the South Island. That year he was first selected for the New Zealand national rugby league team, playing against the French and touring Great Britain and France.

In 1956 he was selected at fullback for the South Island and in 1957 he was selected for the Kiwis squad for the 1957 World Cup. Creedy finished his career with 33 games for the Kiwis, including nine test matches. He scored four tries and 12 goals for New Zealand.

Creedy died on 7 April 2011 in Wyndham, aged 83.

References

New Zealand rugby league players
New Zealand national rugby league team players
Canterbury rugby league team players
South Island rugby league team players
Marist-Western Suburbs players
Rugby league fullbacks
Rugby league halfbacks
New Zealand rugby union players
Canterbury rugby union players
Rugby union scrum-halves
1927 births
2011 deaths
Year of birth uncertain
Place of birth missing